Robert Seymour (ca. 1480–1545), of Ivy Church, Wiltshire and London, was an English politician.

He was a Member (MP) of the Parliament of England for Heytesbury in 1529.

References

1480 births
1545 deaths
People from Wiltshire
Robert
English MPs 1529–1536